Martinaitis is the masculine form of a Lithuanian family name. Its feminine forms  are: Martinaitienė (married woman or widow) and Martinaitytė (unmarried woman).

The surname may refer to:

Algirdas Martinaitis, composer, 1989 recipient of the Lithuanian National Prize 
Marcelijus Martinaitis,  poet, 1998 recipient of the Lithuanian National Prize 

Lithuanian-language surnames